Minibrix were construction kits manufactured from 1935 to 1976 in the UK. Developed in 1935, they enabled children to build their own miniature houses. Like the later and more famous construction toy, Lego, Minibrix consisted primarily of interlocking bricks with moulded studs on the surface, but being invented before the availability of modern plastics they were made of hard rubber which had the necessary ability to deform under pressure to allow firm interlocking of studs and holes.

Minibrix were made by the Premo Rubber Company which traditionally made rubber shoe heels. Premo was a subsidiary of the I.T.S. Rubber Company, which had been founded in 1919 by Arnold Levy, and was located at Sandringham Road, Petersfield, Hampshire, England.

The origin of the Minibrix idea is unclear but Arnold may have seen the fibre-interlocking toy bricks of the early 1930s introduced by the Erector Company in America and the rubber interlocking bricks, called 'Bild-O-Brik' made in Pennsylvania, in 1934.  However, the actual design of the British bricks and the other elements of the Minibrix system are thought to have been the work of a Mr Gilbert, an ITS engineer, and patents for the product were applied for on 5 July 1935 in the names of the Premo Rubber Company and Arnold Levy.

Two series of kits were available in different styles for making Tudor and Modern buildings, and the bases, roofs and lintels were all, like the bricks, made of rubber.

See also
 Kiddicraft
 Erector set
 Lego
 Bayko
 Meccano

References

External links
 Fred Smallbone and Malcolm Hanson's "Minibrix.com" pages - extensive history and reference
 Museum of Childhood site
 Jackie's Architectural Pages
 Bricks that Interlock - Jackie's Architectural Pages
 Powerhouse museum in-depth article full of details
 Hampshire County Council, Museums Service, Childhood Collection

Construction toys
Products introduced in 1935
Toy brands
Toy companies of the United Kingdom
Defunct toy manufacturers